Statistics of Bahraini Premier League for the 1996–97 season.

Overview
Bahrain Riffa Club won the championship.

References
RSSSF

Bahraini Premier League seasons
Bah
1996–97 in Bahraini football